Mecotetartus antennatus is a species of beetle in the family Cerambycidae, the only species in the genus Mecotetartus.

References

Acanthocinini
Monotypic Cerambycidae genera